Ameghiniana is a peer-reviewed scientific journal covering palaeontology published by the Asociación Paleontológica Argentina. It is named after the 19th century Italian Argentine palaeontologist Florentino Ameghino. The discovery of many dinosaurs found in Argentina and South America have first been published in Ameghiniana; examples of this are Argentinosaurus and Herrerasaurus.

Abstracting and indexing 
The journal is abstracted and indexed in:

References

External links 
 
 Asociación Paleontológica Argentina

Paleontology journals
Geology of Argentina
Publications established in 1957
Multilingual journals
Quarterly journals
Academic journals published by learned and professional societies of Argentina